Barcice Dolne is a village in the administrative district of Gmina Stary Sącz, within Nowy Sącz County, Lesser Poland Voivodeship, in southern Poland.

The village has an approximate population of 670. The village was established in 1910 after separation from Barcice (Górne).

References

Villages in Nowy Sącz County